Should not be confused with Independent Paralympic Participants, the name given to Yugoslavian athletes at the 1992 Summer Paralympics

In 2000, East Timor was administered by the United Nations, and did not have a recognised National Paralympic Committee. Two East Timor athletes to take part in the 2000 Summer Paralympics in Sydney, but they competed officially as Individual Paralympic Athletes, rather than as representatives of an NPC.

There were two "individual Paralympians" from East Timor: Alcino Pereira in the men's 5,000m race (T38 category) in track and field; and Mateus Lukas in powerlifting, in the men's up to 48 kg category. Pereira failed to complete his race, while Lukas lifted 105 kg, finishing 13th and last of the athletes who successfully lifted a weight in his category.

Following East Timor's recognition, the country made its official Paralympic début in 2008.

Results

See also
 East Timor at the Paralympics
 Individual Olympic Athletes at the 2000 Summer Olympics
 Individual Paralympic Athletes at the 2016 Summer Paralympics

References

Nations at the 2000 Summer Paralympics
2000
Paralympics
Independent Paralympians at the Paralympic Games